Rika Hiraki and Nana Miyagi were the defending champions but they competed with different partners that year, Hiraki with Amy Frazier and Miyagi with Rachel McQuillan.

Frazier and Hiraki lost in the first round to Laura Golarsa and Liezel Horn.

McQuillan and Miyagi lost in the quarterfinals to Kristie Boogert and Julie Halard-Decugis.

Serena Williams and Venus Williams won in the final 7–5, 6–2 against Cătălina Cristea and Kristine Kunce.

Seeds
Champion seeds are indicated in bold text while text in italics indicates the round in which those seeds were eliminated.

 Katrina Adams /  Debbie Graham (quarterfinals)
 Rachel McQuillan /  Nana Miyagi (quarterfinals)
 Amy Frazier /  Rika Hiraki (first round)
 Catherine Barclay /  Kerry-Anne Guse (first round)

Draw

External links
 1998 IGA Classic Doubles Draw

U.S. National Indoor Championships
1998 WTA Tour